Jean-Philippe "J. P." Darche (born February 28, 1975) is a former American football long snapper. He was signed and drafted by the Toronto Argonauts in 1999. He played CIS football at McGill.

Darche has also played for the Seattle Seahawks and Kansas City Chiefs. He is the older brother of Mathieu Darche, a former National Hockey League player.

Early years
Born in Montreal, Quebec, Canada, Darche's first love was ice hockey. As a youth, along with hockey, he played Bantam AA inter-city baseball with the St-Laurent Orioles. Hockey was his primary sport until high school, when he started playing American football. Darche's younger brother Mathieu is a retired hockey player of the National Hockey League.

High school years
Darche attended Collège Notre-Dame du Sacré-Coeur in Montreal. He was a letterman in football. In football, after his senior season, he was voted to participate in the High School of Montreal All-Star football game.

Junior college years
Darche attended Collège André-Grasset and was an honor student and named Athlete of the Year as a sophomore. His number 44 jersey was retired by the team.

University career
Darche attended McGill University in Montreal where he was a star middle linebacker on McGill Redmen football team for five seasons. He was selected as a co-captain his final two seasons. He concluded his collegiate career as the all-time leading tackler in school history with 272 stops (132 solo). He graduated from McGill with a BSc. in physiology in 1998, then entered McGill Medical School for two years before entering the Canadian Football League in 1999. In 1998, he captured the Russ Jackson Award as the Canadian university football player who best combines athletics with academics and community service.

Professional career

Toronto Argonauts
After playing five seasons for McGill, Darche turned pro with the Toronto Argonauts of the Canadian Football League in the 1999 CFL season. He was drafted in the third round of the 1999 CFL Draft, the first linebacker selected that year, and signed with the team on June 4, 1999, just in time to report for training camp. He recorded 16 special teams tackles in 16 regular season games and one playoff game over the 1999 Toronto Argonauts season, the most of anyone on the team.

Seattle Seahawks
He played one season as a long snapper with the Argonauts before signing with the NFL's Seattle Seahawks in 2000, since then Darche was responsible for the long snaps. He became the second Canadian Interuniversity Sport graduate to play the Super Bowl when he participated in Super Bowl XL in 2006. At the beginning of the 2006 season, he was named one of the Seahawks' captains. He was released by the Seahawks in February 2007 after a hip injury in the 2006 NFL season. In his seven seasons in Seattle, he played in 97 games, recording 18 special teams tackles. He also had one fumble recovery and one forced fumble on special teams. The fumble recovery during the 2005 ensured that the Seahawks would win in St. Louis for the first time since 1997.

Kansas City Chiefs
He was signed by the Kansas City Chiefs in March 2007 after Kendall Gammon retired. He got hurt during the 2008 season and spent the remainder of the year on Injured Reserve. Darche was then released on March 19, 2009.

Post NFL career
After being ignored by NFL teams for the 2009 NFL season, Darche decided to retire from football and to continue his studies in medicine at the University of Kansas. He has been named to the Alpha Omega Alpha Honour Medical Society.
He has finished a fellowship in sports medicine and currently practices at the University of Kansas Health System. He is a team physician for his former team, Kansas City Chiefs.

References

External links
NFL.com stats
ESPN.com stats
McGill Athletics feature on Darche
Kansas City Chiefs profile
Just Sports Stats

1975 births
Living people
American football long snappers
Canadian football linebackers
Canadian players of American football
Kansas City Chiefs players
McGill Redbirds football players
Players of Canadian football from Quebec
Seattle Seahawks players
Canadian football people from Montreal
Toronto Argonauts players
Gridiron football people from Quebec